The 2017 World Senior Curling Championships was held from April 22 to 29 at the Lethbridge Curling Club in Lethbridge, Alberta. The event was held in conjunction with the 2017 World Mixed Doubles Curling Championship.

Men

Round-robin standings

Playoffs

Women

Round-robin standings

Tie Breakers
Thursday April 27,  8:00 am

Playoffs

References

External links

World Senior Curling Championships
2017 in Canadian curling
International curling competitions hosted by Canada
Sport in Lethbridge
April 2017 sports events in Canada
Curling in Alberta 
2017 in Alberta